Nicholle Marie Tom is an American actress. She is best known for her roles as Ryce Newton in Beethoven (1992), Beethoven's 2nd (1993), Beethoven (1994–1995), and as Maggie Sheffield on The Nanny. She is also known for voicing Supergirl in the DC Animated Universe.

Early life
Tom has a twin brother, David Tom, best known for his role as Billy Abbott on The Young and the Restless, and an older sister, Heather Tom, who is best known for her roles as Katie Logan on The Bold and The Beautiful and as Victoria Newman on The Young and the Restless from 1990-2003.

Career
In 1992, Tom played the small role of Scott Scanlon's sister, Sue, on Beverly Hills, 90210. In 1992 and 1993, she played Ryce Newton in the successful family films Beethoven and Beethoven's 2nd. She reprised her role as the voice of Ryce in the cartoon spinoff. 

From 1993 to 1999, she played Mr. Sheffield's eldest daughter, Maggie Sheffield in The Nanny. 

Tom was a member of the cast of Jim Henson Presents Mother Goose Stories in 1997-98. From 1998 to 2006, she provided the voice for Supergirl in the DC Animated Universe.

In 2000, she played Sarah Bryann in the Fox Family television film, Ice Angel, and played Tracy in Panic. In 2001, she portrayed a teen reporter, Cassie, in The Princess Diaries.

In 2006, she co-starred in the IFC original The Minor Accomplishments of Jackie Woodman as Tara, an underling at a film production company. Tom played a small role in "Loose Ends", the September 20, 2007 episode of Burn Notice.
 
In March 2008, she starred in the Lifetime film, Her Only Child, that premiered on March 22, 2008. She guest-starred alongside brother David, who played her character's brother in "Damaged", the April 2, 2008, episode of Criminal Minds. She guest-starred on the May 4, 2008, episode of Cold Case.

She competes on the twenty-fourth season of Worst Cooks in America, the show's seventh celebrity edition titled Thats So 90s, airing in April and May 2022.

Filmography

Film

Television

Theme parks
Tom reprised her role as Kara Kent / Supergirl for the Justice League: Alien Invasion 3D dark ride at Warner Bros. Movie World in Australia as well as the seven Justice League: Battle for Metropolis dark rides across Six Flags theme parks in the United States and Mexico.

Awards and nominations

Young Artist Awards
{| class="wikitable plainrowheaders sortable" style="margin-right: 0;" width = 70%
|-
! scope="col" width=35px | Year
! scope="col" | Nominated work
! scope="col" | Category
! scope="col" width=50px | Result
! scope="col" class="unsortable" | 
|-
| 1993
| Beethoven
| Best Young Actress Starring in a Motion Picture
| 
| 
|-
|rowspan="2"| 1994
|rowspan="2"| The Nanny
| Youth Actress Leading Role in a Television Series
| 
| 
|-
| Outstanding Youth Ensemble in a Television Series
| 
| 
|-
|rowspan="2"| 1995
| Beethoven's 2nd
| Best Performance by a Youth Ensemble in a Motion Picture
| 
| 
|-
|rowspan="2"| The Nanny
| Best Performance by a Youth Ensemble in a Television Series
| 
| 
|-
| 1996
| Best Performance by a Young Actress – TV Comedy Series
| 
| 
|-
| 1999
| Welcome to Paradox
| Best Performance in a TV Drama Series – Guest Starring Young Actress
| 
| 
|-

Young Star Awards
{| class="wikitable plainrowheaders sortable" style="margin-right: 0;" width = 70%
|-
! scope="col" width=35px | Year
! scope="col" | Nominated work
! scope="col" | Category
! scope="col" width=50px | Result
! scope="col" class="unsortable" | 
|-
| 1995
| The Nanny
| Best Performance by a Young Actress in a Comedy TV Series
| 
| 
|-
| 1997
| My Daughter's Horror
| Best Performance by a Young Actress in a Made For TV Movie
| 
| 
|-

References

External links
 

Living people
American television actresses
American film actresses
American voice actresses
American child actresses
Actresses from Illinois
People from Hinsdale, Illinois
20th-century American actresses
21st-century American actresses
American twins
Year of birth missing (living people)